David Ireland (born 1976) is a Northern Irish-born playwright and actor, known for his award-winning plays Cyprus Avenue and Ulster American.

Early life and career
Ireland was born in Sandy Row, Belfast, but grew up in Ballybeen, Dundonald, County Down, where he attended Brooklands Primary School. He then attended the Royal Belfast Academical Institution, before receiving training at the Royal Scottish Academy of Music and Drama.

In 2009, Ireland's What The Animals Say was produced by Òran Mór in Glasgow. In 2010, Everything Between Us, first produced by Solas Nua and Tinderbox Theatre Company, was performed in Belfast, Scotland and Washington, D.C. It won the Stewart Parker Trust BBC Radio Drama Award, and the Meyer-Whitworth Award for Best New Play.

In 2016, Ireland's Cyprus Avenue premiered at the Royal Court Theatre. It was awarded the 2017 Irish Times Theatre Award for Best New Play, and the 2017 James Tait Black Memorial Prize for Drama. The play then transferred to The Public Theater, New York City, the Abbey Theatre, Dublin, and the Metropolitan Arts Centre, Belfast. It returned to the Royal Court in February 2019 for a four-week run, and had its Australian debut in May 2019 at Sydney's Old Fitzroy Theatre. The Abbey Theatre performance with Stephen Rea was ranked by The Guardian writers as the 27th best theatre show since 2000.

In 2018, Ireland's satirical dark comedy Ulster American was performed by Traverse Theatre as part of their Edinburgh Festival Fringe season. It was awarded the Carol Tambor Best of Edinburgh Award for that year. In 2019, it was nominated for Best Female Performance, Best New Play, Best Production, and Best Male Performance at the Critics' Awards for Theatre in Scotland, winning the first three.

Ireland had two lines in the first episode of 2018's Derry Girls. He wrote the upcoming in 2023 Sky Atlantic series The Lovers.

Personal life
Ireland met his wife Jennifer while he was acting in Glasgow, where they now live with their children Ada and Elijah.

Selected works
What The Animals Say (Òran Mór, Glasgow, 2009)
Everything Between Us (Tinderbox Theatre Company, 2010)
Summertime (Tinderbox Theatre Company, 2013)
Can't Forget About You (Lyric Theatre, Belfast, 2013)
Cyprus Avenue (Royal Court Theatre, 2016)
The End of Hope (Soho Theatre, 2017)
Ulster American (Traverse Theatre, 2018)
Yes So I Said Yes (Finborough Theatre, 2021)

Selected awards
2017 Irish Times Theatre Award for Best New Play – Cyprus Avenue
2017 James Tait Black Memorial Prize for Drama – Cyprus Avenue
2018 Carol Tambor Best of Edinburgh Award – Ulster American
2019 Critics' Awards for Theatre in Scotland for Best Female Performance, Best New Play, and Best Production – Ulster American

Selected filmography
Shetland (2 episodes, 2014)
Finlay Caulfield - S2 Ep5/6
Still Game (1 episode, 2016)
Derry Girls (3 episodes, 2018-2022)

References

1976 births
Living people
Alumni of the Royal Conservatoire of Scotland
Male dramatists and playwrights from Northern Ireland
Writers from Belfast